The Montenegrin Women's Football league  or 1. ŽFL is the top level women's football league of Montenegro. It is organized by the Football Association of Montenegro.

The winning team of the league is eligible for a spot in the UEFA Women's Champions League.

The first national women's football competition was held in the season 2008-09, but the league played its inaugural season in 2011-12.

History
Women's football history in Montenegro started in the period after the Montenegrin independence referendum. Beside the fact that the first women's club was founded in 2005, competitions started years after that. In 2008, Football Association of Montenegro founded national women's team and first women's competition - a yearly tournament called FSCG Trophy. With its first season 2008-09, FSCG trophy matches lasted 60 minutes, with seven substitutes allowed. From season 2011-12, Montenegrin Women's First League is founded (commonly known as 1. ŽFL), with participation of the champion in the UEFA Women's Champions League.

FSCG Trophy (2008-2011)
Inaugural competition for women, Trophy of Montenegrin FA (Trofej FSCG) lasted three seasons. With matches' duration of 60 minutes, competition was preparation for founding of First Montenegrin Women's Football League. 
First two editions of FSCG Trophy (2008–09, 2009–10) won ŽFK Palma from Podgorica (from season 2016-17 under the name ŽFK Budućnost Podgorica). On season 2010-11, winner was ŽFK Ekonomist from Nikšić.
In the first season of FSCG trophy participated only four clubs, but until the season 2010-11 there was six members of the competition.

First Women's League (2011-)
First matches of Montenegrin Women's League (1. ŽFL) were played in autumn 2011. In its first season, new competition with conventional rules (90 minutes games, 3 substitutes) had participants from all three regions of Montenegro (northern, central and southern).
In period from 2011 to 2015, most successful squad in 1. ŽFL was ŽFK Ekonomist. They won four consecutive titles, mostly finishing the seasons without a single defeat. Successes of ŽFK Ekonomist finished on the season 2015-16, whose winner was ŽFK Breznica from Pljevlja. That was the beginning of ŽFK Breznica dominaton. They won six titles in a row, including the season 2019-20, which was interrupted due to COVID-19 pandemic in Montenegro. Season 2020-21 was remembered by most dramatic title race, which won ŽFK Breznica, thanks to one single goal more than second-placed ŽFK Budućnost in their head-to-head matches.
Since foundation, 1. ŽFL had different number of participants: 2011/12 - 7 clubs; 2012-13 - 6 clubs; 2013/14 - 7 clubs; 2014/15 - 8 clubs; 2015/16 - 8 clubs; 2016/17 - 5 clubs; 2017/18 - 4 clubs; 2018/19 - 7 clubs; 2019/20 - 6 clubs; 2020/21 - 5 clubs.

Champions and top goalscorers

Titles by seasons

Titles by team

Top scorers

Participants and records

All-time participants (2008-)
Since foundation, in Montenegrin Women's League participated 16 different clubs. Below is a list of participants with number of seasons in the First League and total games, with victories, draws and defeats.

Records
Biggest league victory/defeat: 28–0, Budućnost vs. Ribnica, 29.04.2012 (season 2011-12); 27–0, Ekonomist vs. Cvetex, 28.03.2014 (season 2013-14)
Longest unbeaten run: 91 matches, Ekonomist, 20.05.2010 - 09.11.2015
Longest winning streak: 88 matches, Ekonomist, 20.05.2010 - 24.09.2015
Longest run without win: 20 matches, Ulcinj, 18.05.2013 - 19.05.2014
Longest losing streak: 19 matches, Cvetex, 23.09.2017 - 02.12.2018
Most points by season: 54, Ekonomist, season 2013-14
Fewest points by season: 0, Ribnica, season 2010-11; Durmitor, season 2012-13; Lovćen, season 2016-17
Highest number of scored goals by season: 252, Ekonomist, season 2013-14
Highest number of conceded goals by season: 131, Cvetex, season 2015-16
Sources:

Current clubs (2020-21)
The 2020-21 Montenegrin Women's First League is 13th season of top-tier football in Montenegro. ŽFK Breznica Pljevlja are defending champions title. 
The following five clubs complete in First League 2020-21.

Sources:

Montenegrin clubs in European competitions

Since the season 2012-13, champion of Montenegrin Women's League is playing in the UEFA Women's Champions League. In the period 2012-2015, the only Montenegrin representative was ŽFK Ekonomist. From season 2016-17 to 2020-21, Montenegro was represented in UEFA Champions League by ŽFK Breznica.
Below is a table with Montenegrin clubs' scores in UEFA competitions.

As of the end of UEFA competitions 2020–21 season.

See also
Montenegrin Cup (women)
Football Association of Montenegro
Football in Montenegro
Montenegrin First League

References

External links 
Montenegrin Women's League at Federation website
mnesport.me
cg-fudbal.com

Top level women's association football leagues in Europe
League
Women
Sports leagues established in 2011
2011 establishments in Montenegro
Women's sports leagues in Montenegro